Jacob is an unincorporated community in Jackson County, Illinois, United States. Jacob has a post office with ZIP code 62950.

References

Unincorporated communities in Jackson County, Illinois
Unincorporated communities in Illinois